John G. Price (August 10, 1871 – November 23, 1930) was a Republican lawyer from the U.S. state of Ohio who served as Ohio Attorney General 1919–1923.

Biography

John G. Price was born in Stark County, Ohio, and graduated from high school in Canton. He became a letter carrier at an early age, and his patrons included William McKinley, later Governor and President. McKinley arranged for Price to be transferred to the postal service in Washington, D.C. There he attended night school at Georgetown University, and earned a law degree.

Price moved to Columbus, Ohio, where he practiced. He was special counsel in the office of the Franklin County prosecuting attorney, and in the office of Ohio Attorney General Edward C. Turner. In 1918, Price was elected Attorney General, and was re-elected in 1920, serving four years.

In 1904, Price was married to Salome C. Royer, and had three children: John G. Price, Jr., Salome Kathleen Price Reinhard, and Richard Royer Price.

Price was exalted ruler of Columbus Lodge No. 37, B.P.O.E. and was elected grand exalted ruler for 1924–25 at the Boston annual convention. He was also grand knight of the Knights of Columbus.

Price died November 23, 1930 of a cerebral hemorrhage. He had also been suffering from a long illness.

References

External links

Politicians from Canton, Ohio
Lawyers from Columbus, Ohio
Ohio Attorneys General
Ohio Republicans
1871 births
Georgetown University Law Center alumni
1930 deaths
Lawyers from Canton, Ohio
Politicians from Columbus, Ohio